Nancy Lee Katz (June 12, 1947 - March 22, 2018) was an American photographer.  Katz was known for her portraits of famous musicians, artists, photographers, architects, writers, and Supreme Court Justices.

The Museum of Fine Arts, Houston holds forty-six of her photographs, including her portraits of Richard Serra, Robert Rauschenberg, Ravi Shankar, Maya Lin, Martin Puryear and Louise Bourgeois. Her work is also included in the collections of the Art Institute of Chicago, the Museum of Fine Arts Boston, the National Library of France,  RISD Museum.,Albertina Museum,Library of Congress,Nelson-Atkins Museum,National Gallery of Art, Royal Collection Trust,George Eastman Museum, and Harvard Art Museums.

Malcolm Daniel, Curator of Photography at Museum of Fine Arts Houston, has written a short essay on Katz and Nadar:

References

1947 births
2018 deaths
20th-century American photographers
21st-century American photographers
20th-century American women artists
21st-century American women artists